The 2008 United States Senate election in Louisiana was held on November 4, 2008. This was the first time since the 1970s that Louisiana used primaries for federal races. Incumbent Democratic Senator Mary Landrieu won reelection to a third term, defeating Republican (and former Democrat) John Kennedy.  Despite being forecast as one of the most vulnerable Senate Democrats during 2008, Landrieu won a comfortable victory of 6.4 percentage points.

Landrieu had received praise and wide publicity for her advocacy after Hurricane Katrina, particularly during hearings regarding FEMA's response to the disaster. Kennedy had switched parties in 2007, just one year before the election, garnering allegations of being a political opportunist. Kennedy won the state's other U.S. Senate seat in 2016. , this is the last time that the Democrats won a U.S. Senate election in Louisiana.

Background 
Landrieu's increased vulnerability was supposed to be the result of a significant drop in the state's African-American population after Hurricane Katrina, especially in Landrieu's home city of New Orleans. Louisiana also elected a Republican senator in 2004 and President Bush carried the state twice, in 2004 with 58 percent of the vote. Also, Republican Congressman Bobby Jindal won the 2007 gubernatorial election with 54 percent of the vote. After a continued backslide in support for the Democrats, Landrieu lost her seat by 12 points in 2014 to Bill Cassidy. Kennedy was later elected in the other Senate seat in 2016.

Major candidates

Democratic 
 Mary Landrieu, incumbent U.S. Senator

Republican 
 John Neely Kennedy, State Treasurer and Democratic candidate for the U.S. Senate in 2004

General election

Predictions

Polling

Results 
Though she was considered one of the most vulnerable incumbent senators in 2008, Landrieu won reelection by a margin of 121,121 votes and 6.39%, over-performing Democratic presidential nominee Barack Obama in the state by more than 12 percentage points.

See also 
 2008 United States Senate elections

References

External links 
 Elections Division from the Louisiana Secretary of State
 U.S. Congress candidates for Louisiana at Project Vote Smart
 Louisiana U.S. Senate from CQ Politics
 Louisiana U.S. Senate from OurCampaigns.com
 Campaign contributions from OpenSecrets

2008
Louisiana
United States Senate